Martha Ross (24 March 193914 January 2019) was a British actress and radio presenter.

Family
Ross was the mother of television presenters Jonathan and Paul Ross. She also had three other sons named Simon, Miles and Adam, and a daughter named Liza, who works in the media. She married actor Tony Phillips in 1992.

Career 
Ross worked as an extra in EastEnders from its inception until November 2006, when her contract was terminated because she told her son Paul an EastEnders Christmas storyline, which he leaked on his LBC radio show.

She also appeared in Grange Hill, The Sean Hughes Show, Space Virgins and Barrymore, and hosted a current affairs show on Liberty Radio. Ross wrote a weekly agony aunt column for Real People magazine. She appeared in many theatre roles, including The Last Game, Atlantis, The Firm's Big Night Out and Stained Glass.

In her later years, she lived in Hitchin, Hertfordshire.

References

1939 births
2019 deaths
English television actresses
British radio presenters
British women radio presenters
Martha
20th-century English actresses
21st-century English actresses